The 2020–21 Grambling State Tigers men's basketball team represented Grambling State University in the 2020–21 NCAA Division I men's basketball season. The Tigers, led by fourth-year head coach Donte Jackson, played their home games at the Fredrick C. Hobdy Assembly Center in Grambling, Louisiana as members of the Southwestern Athletic Conference.

Previous season
The Tigers finished the 2019–20 season 17–15, 11–7 in SWAC play to finish in a three-way tie for fourth place. They lost in the quarterfinals of the SWAC tournament to Texas Southern.

Roster

Schedule and results 

|-
!colspan=12 style=| Non-conference regular season

|-
!colspan=12 style=| SWAC regular season

|-
!colspan=12 style=| SWAC tournament
|-

|-

Sources

References

Grambling State Tigers men's basketball seasons
Grambling State Tigers
Grambling State Tigers men's basketball
Grambling State Tigers men's basketball